Penu (also Romanized as Penū; also known as Pūnū) is a village in Kuhsarat Rural District in the Central District of Minudasht County, Golestan Province, Iran. At the 2006 census, its population was 281, in 80 families.

References 

Populated places in Minudasht County